The Chilik (Shilik, or Шелек Shelek) is a major flowing river in the Almaty Region in the Republic of Kazakhstan, one of the largest left tributaries of the Ili, and the main waterway of southeastern Kazakhstan. The Bartogay reservoir has been created on the river, from where the Great Almaty canal begins.

Location
In the valley of the river is the village of Shelek with the same name, the former Administrative centre of the Chilik district of Almaty region (now merged with the Enbekshikazakh District). Also in the valley of the river are the villages of Malybai, Bijanova, Bayseit, Sarybulak, Milyanfan and Masak.

Current
It then goes to the Ili valley, where it is divided into the Kur-Chilik and Ulhun-Chilik branches. It flows into the Kapchagay Reservoir. Tributaries to Zhenishke. The average annual water discharge is 63 km from the mouth 32.2 m3 per sec. The water of the river is mainly used for the purpose of irrigation. Recently, the river has become increasingly popular as an object of tourism for extreme water sports (also includes the Sharyn River, Kazan River and Koksu River).

References 

Rivers of Kazakhstan